Aldebert de Chambrun (1872-1962) was a French general and a member of the Pineton de Chambrun aristocratic family.

Early life
Aldebert de Chambrun was born on July 23, 1872 in Washington, D.C. He graduated from the École Militaire in 1904.

Career
De Chambrun was as an artillery general in the French Army. He served in the Rif War in Morocco under Hubert Lyautey from the 1920s. He served in Bordeaux from 1932 to 1934.

De Chambrun was appointed as the governor-general of the American Hospital of Paris in Neuilly-sur-Seine in 1941.

Personal life and death
De Chambrun married Clara Longworth de Chambrun. They had a son, René de Chambrun, who married Josée Laval, the daughter of Vichy France Prime Minister Pierre Laval. 

De Chambrun died on April 22, 1962 in Paris, France.

Works

References

1872 births
1962 deaths
Military personnel from Washington, D.C.
Military personnel from Paris
French generals
French non-fiction writers
Recipients of the Distinguished Service Medal (US Army)
Foreign recipients of the Distinguished Service Medal (United States)